Turrialba is a district of the Turrialba canton, in the Cartago province of Costa Rica.

Geography 
Turrialba has an area of  km² and an elevation of  metres.

Demographics 

For the 2011 census, Turrialba had a population of  inhabitants.

Transportation

Road transportation 
The district is covered by the following road routes:
 National Route 10
 National Route 230
 National Route 411
 National Route 415

Economy 
The main industries are textiles, agriculture and tourism. The Pacuare and Reventazón Rivers are notable for whitewater rafting, making Turrialba a mecca for the sport.

"Several cities developed and prospered as a result of the building of the railroad to the Caribbean; Turrialba is one of these, and its architectural, spatial and ethnic makeup is different from other towns. Declared a City of National Archeological Interest, this town is the entryway to the Costa Rican Caribbean.

Turrialba’s outskirts contain appealing rural communities such as Santa Cruz, where homemade Turrialba cheese is produced, La Suiza and Aquiares, as well as the rapids of the Reventazón and Pacuare rivers."
 Serpentario Viborana, a snake rehabilitation center, is also located in Turrialba.

Baseball factory
The town is also home to the only official Major League baseball factory, moved there from Haiti by Rawlings in the late 1980s. This factory is a major employer in an otherwise exclusively farming economy.

Education and Research 
Two universities are located here: the Tropical Agronomy Research and Learning Centre (CATIE), of international influence, and the University of Costa Rica.

Sports
The town's football club is Turrialba FC, who have spent several seasons in the Costa Rican Primera División. They play their home games at the Estadio Rafael Ángel Camacho.

References 

Districts of Cartago Province
Populated places in Cartago Province